A medical robot is a robot used in the medical sciences. They include surgical robots. These are in most telemanipulators, which use the surgeon's activators on one side to control the "effector" on the other side.

Types

 Surgical robots: These robots either allow surgical operations to be carried out with better precision than an unaided human surgeon or allow remote surgery where a human surgeon is not physically present with the patient.
 Rehabilitation robots: facilitate and support the lives of infirm, elderly people, or those with dysfunction of body parts affecting movement. These robots are also used for rehabilitation and related procedures, such as training and therapy.
 Biorobots: a group of robots designed to imitate the cognition of humans and animals.
 Telepresence robots: allow off-site medical professionals to move, look around, communicate, and participate from remote locations.
 Pharmacy automation: robotic systems to dispense oral solids in a retail pharmacy setting or preparing sterile IV admixtures in a hospital pharmacy setting.
 Companion robot: has the capability to engage emotionally with users keeping them company and alerting if there is a problem with their health.
 Disinfection robot: has the capability to disinfect a whole room in mere minutes, generally using pulsed ultraviolet light. They are being used to fight Ebola virus disease.
 Hospital robots - With a pre-programmed layout of their environment and built-in sensors, hospital robots deliver medications, meals and specimens around hospitals.
  Robotic prosthetics - Focuses on providing their wearers with life-like limb functionality.
 Laboratory robots - Types of robots found in labs are specially designed to either automate processes or assist lab technicians in completing repetitive tasks.

See also

 Biothreat
 Robots in healthcare
 Hospi
 Open-source robotics
 Robot & Frank

References

External links
 Medical Robotics Text Book
 Medical Robots Conference 
 Robotic IV Automation - RIVA
 Where Are the Elder Care Robots?
 Notable Chinese Firms Emerging in Medical Robots Sector  (IEEE)
 Medical Robots- Towards Robotics

Medical robots